Hyalurga vinosa is a moth of the family Erebidae first described by Dru Drury in 1773. It is found on Saint Kitts, Antigua, Jamaica and the Dominican Republic.

The larvae feed on Heliotropium indicum.

References

Moths described in 1773
Hyalurga
Taxa named by Dru Drury